Irshava Raion (Irshavskiy rayon) was a raion (district) of Zakarpattia Oblast in the westernmost corner of Ukraine. The only city and the administrative center was Irshava. Irshava Raion was situated on the foothills on the Carpathian Mountains. The raion was abolished and its territory was merged into Khust Raion  on 18 July 2020 as part of the administrative reform of Ukraine, which reduced the number of raions of Zakarpattia Oblast to six.. Also some parts of it went to Berehove and Mukachevo districts.

Notable residents
 Viktor Pasulko (b. 1961), retired Ukrainian footballer and football manager, Soviet Top League winner in 1987 and 1989, UEFA Euro 1988 runner-up

See also
Zacharovana Dolina State Park

References

External links

 carpathia.gov.ua — Official website of Zakarpattia Oblast Administration 
 Verkhovna Rada website — Zakarpattia Oblast data
 all.zakarpattya.net — All about Zakarpattia  
 mukachevo.net — Zakarpattia Oblast informational portal 
 map.meta.ua — Digital map of Zakarpattia Oblast 

Former raions of Zakarpattia Oblast
1946 establishments in Ukraine
Ukrainian raions abolished during the 2020 administrative reform